Wall Township is one of twelve townships in Ford County, Illinois, USA.  As of the 2010 census, its population was 209 and it contained 82 housing units.  The township was formed from Patton Township on June 12, 1867.

Geography

Airports and landing strips
 Beherns Airport

Demographics

School districts
 Gibson City-Melvin-Sibley Community Unit School District 5
 Paxton-Buckley-Loda Community Unit School District 10

Political districts
 Illinois' 15th congressional district
 State House District 105
 State Senate District 53

References
 
 United States Census Bureau 2007 TIGER/Line Shapefiles
 United States National Atlas

External links
 City-Data.com
 Illinois State Archives

Townships in Ford County, Illinois
Townships in Illinois